The Limbour District (District 10) is a municipal district in the city of Gatineau, Quebec. It is represented on Gatineau City Council by Louis Sabourin of Action Gatineau.

The district is located in the Gatineau sector of the city. The district includes the neighbourhoods of Côte-d'Azur, Mont-Luc and Limbour.

Councillors
Simon Racine (2001–2009)
Nicole Champagne (2009–2013)
Cédric Tessier (2013–2017)
Renée Amyot, Action Gatineau (2017–2021)
Louis Sabourin, Action Gatineau (2021–present)

Election results

2021

2017

2013

2009

2005

References

Districts of Gatineau